Golestan Mahalleh (also Romanized as Golestān Maḩalleh; also known as Golestān) is a village in Do Hezar Rural District, Khorramabad District, Tonekabon County, Mazandaran Province, Iran. At the 2006 census, its population was 85, in 23 families.

References 

Populated places in Tonekabon County